Lomax, the Hound of Music is a 2008 American children's television series that uses puppets, humans, live music and animation. It aims to promote musical education for children ages 3–7, inspired by John Feierabend's "First Steps in Music" curriculum for music educators.  It was created by Christopher Cerf, Norman Stiles and Louise Gikow, and produced by Sirius Thinking, Ltd., Eyevox, Inc., and Connecticut Public Television. Lomax first aired on October 6, 2008 to positive reception from parents and critics. It was initially announced that the series would premiere in 2007, but was instead released in 2008. The series ended on December 29, 2008. Upon conclusion, PBS lost the rights to the show and Sirius Thinking became the primary owner. In 2010, selected PBS stations announced that they would rerun the series for a short period of time.

Lomax, the Hound of Music follows the adventures of Lomax (named after American ethnomusicologist Alan Lomax), a good-natured, melody-obsessed puppet hound dog, his fluffy cat sidekick, Delta, and their human companion, Amy. The three travel across the United States of America on a steam train named the Melody Hound Express, and explore songs in different music genres and music styles.

Classic Children's Songs Used on the Show

The Melody Hound Express (opening)
My Dog Has Fleas
Bill Grogan's Goat
There Ain't No Bugs on Me
Aloha ʻOe
John Jacob Jingleheimer Schmidt
The Old Hen Cackled
Buffalo Gals
All the Pretty Little Horses
The Horse Stood Around
The Old Bell Cow
Toodala
There's a Hole in the Bucket
Mother Gooney Bird
The Old Oaken Bucket
The Itsy Bitsy Spider
Alabama Bound
Skip to My Lou
Row, Row, Row Your Boat
Down by the Bay
Michael, Row the Boat Ashore
The Cat Came Back
Kitty in the Straw (Turkey in the Straw parody)
Whoa Mule
Oh, In the Woods (The Green Grass Grew All Around)
It's Raining It's Pouring
Ragtime Annie
The Arkansas Traveler
Miss Mary Mack
Pay Me My Money Down
Miss Mary Mack Hip Hop Remix
I Had a Rooster
The Bear Went Over the Mountain
The Other Day I Met a Bear
My Father's Whiskers
Jim Along Josie
She'll Be Comin' 'Round the Mountain 
Turkey in the Straw
The Duet for Two Cats (Gioachino Rossini)
Crabfish
John the Rabbit
The Long-Legged Sailor
Polly Wolly Doodle
Derby Ram
The ABC Song!

References

External links 

PBS original programming
2000s American children's television series
2008 American television series debuts
2008 American television series endings
American preschool education television series
American television shows featuring puppetry
American television series with live action and animation
2000s preschool education television series
English-language television shows
PBS Kids shows
Television series about cats
Television shows about dogs
American children's musical television series